Marko Todorović may refer to:

Marko Todorović (actor) (1929–2000), Serbian actor
Marko Todorović (basketball) (born 1992), Montenegrin professional basketball player
Marko Todorović (revolutionary) (1780–1823), on the List of Serbian Revolutionaries